The 1923–24 Sheffield Shield season was the 28th season of the Sheffield Shield, the domestic first-class cricket competition of Australia. Victoria won the championship.

Table

Statistics

Most Runs
Bill Ponsford 529

Most Wickets
Albert Hartkopf 22

References

Sheffield Shield
Sheffield Shield
Sheffield Shield seasons